D. C. Srikantappa (born 6 March 1929) was a member of the 14th Lok Sabha of India. He represented the Chikmagalur constituency of Karnataka and was a member of the Bharatiya Janata Party (BJP) political party.

External links
 Members of Fourteenth Lok Sabha - Parliament of India website

1929 births
2008 deaths
Bharatiya Janata Party politicians from Karnataka
India MPs 2004–2009
People from Chikkamagaluru
India MPs 1998–1999
India MPs 1999–2004
Lok Sabha members from Karnataka